Turnbull ministry may refer to:

 First Turnbull ministry
 Second Turnbull ministry